Operation Java is a 2021 Indian Malayalam-language crime thriller film produced by V Cinemas International, written and directed by Tharun Moorthy (in his feature film debut). It stars an ensemble cast including Balu Varghese, Lukman Avaran, Binu Pappu, Irshad, Shine Tom Chacko, Mamitha Baiju and Vinayakan. The story details an investigation undertaken by a cyber cell police station in Kochi. The film released on 12 February 2021 and received positive reviews from critics.

Synopsis
The film is based on real-life cases and portrays investigations undertaken by a cyber cell police station in Cochin over the period of a year and half with the help of two engineering graduates. Cases involve film piracy, job fraud, and murder. Antony George and Vinay Dasan are the two opportunist youths who join the team as temporary employees in the cyber cell and help the team solve cases using their skills. In the end, they end up not permanently hired, in spite of the initial promise. The film explores the darker side of information technology and its users. The film also conveys the struggles of temporary/ intern/ apprentice staff who work hard but don't get proper recognition or financial benefits for their work.

Cast 

 Balu Varghese as Antony George
 Lukman Avaran as Vinaya Dasan
 Irshad as SI Prathapan, SHO - Cyber Cell, Kochi Unit
 Binu Pappu as ASI Joy, Cyber Cell Kochi Unit
 Prasanth Alexander as  Basheer, Senior CPO -Cyber Cell Kochi Unit
 Shine Tom Chacko as CI Jacob Mani
 Sminu Sijo as Antony's mother
 Vinayakan as Ramanathan 
 Dhanya Ananya as Janaki, Ramanathan's wife
 Mamitha Baiju as Alphonsa
 Johny Antony as Baburaj
 P. Balachandran as Balachandran
 Mathew Thomas as Jerry
 Anju Mary Thomas as Anjali, Jerry's love interest
 Unniraj as Akhileshettan, Anjali's love interest
 Sarath Thenumoola as Vellayyan
Vinitha Koshy as Shruthi
Rithu Manthra as Kavitha David
 Dinesh Prabhakar as Johnny, Kavitha's husband
 Deepak Vijayan as Aneesh
 Jose Shipyard as Police Officer Peter
 Sanjay K Nair as Sanjay
 Vinod Bose as Ravi
 Parvathy
 Althaf Salim
 Akhil as Dany
 Jaiz as Jaiz 
 Sufi as Aravind
 Dilshana Dilshad as Maya (Ramanathan's daughter)
 Sanju as Sanju Techy
 Shiny Zara as Sanju Techy's mother
 Anil Kumar
 Jaise Jose
 Sunil Meleppuram
 Manikandan as Driver Baburaj
 Sreeja Ajith as Jerry's mother
 Eldho Raju
 Ramesh Chandran

Production
Tharun Moorthy was a former assistant professor of Computer Science and Engineering in college Of Engineering Kidangoor who turned into an advertisement filmmaker. Operation Java is the feature film directorial debut of Moorthy who also wrote the screenplay. It was screenwriter John Paul Puthusery who invited Moorthy to make a feature film after seeing a short film he scripted. Director Moorthy described the film as an investigative thriller, and it's based on real-life cases that follows an investigation by a team over a period of a year-and-a-half. It takes place in 2015 - 2017 period. The film was produced by V Cinemas International

Principal photography took place at Kochi, Thiruvananthapuram, Vaikom, and Tamil Nadu. A location in Kakkanad served as the police station. Faiz Siddik was the cinematographer. Filming was wrapped in early March 2020. Dubbing of the film was held at a studio in Kochi in June 2020.

Home Media
The satellite rights and digital rights of the film is acquired by Zee Keralam channel and ZEE5 OTT platform. 
This film premiered on 15 May through the Television Channel Zee Keralam and through Zee5 OTT platform.

Reception
Baradwaj Rangan of Film Companion South wrote "The film is a beautiful combination of romance and practicality and the cruelty of the establishment."

Music

The original soundtrack is composed, programmed, and arranged by Jakes Bejoy.

References

External links

2020s Malayalam-language films
2021 films
2021 crime thriller films
Films scored by Jakes Bejoy